Kyle Jacob Trask (born March 6, 1998) is an American football quarterback for the Tampa Bay Buccaneers of the National Football League (NFL). He played college football at Florida and was selected by the Buccaneers in the second round of the 2021 NFL Draft.

High school career
Trask attended Manvel High School in Manvel, Texas. He did not start any games at quarterback after his freshman year as he served as a backup to D'Eriq King. He graduated in 2016 and committed to the University of Florida to play college football as a three star recruit.

College career

2016–2018
Trask was redshirted in his first year at Florida in 2016. Trask did not see any action in 2017 at Florida. He was originally intended to compete with Feleipe Franks for the starting job, but suffered an injury which cost him the season. 

In 2018, he played in four games as a backup to Franks, completing 14 of 22 passes for 162 yards and a touchdown. His season came to an end after he again injured his foot during practice.

2019
Trask entered his junior year in 2019 again as a backup to Franks. After Franks was injured, Trask took over as the starter. Making his first start since his freshman year of high school, Trask completed 20 of 28 passes with two touchdowns and two interceptions in a win against Tennessee. Trask passed for 363 yards in a 56–0 win over Vanderbilt, the most passing yards in a game by a Florida quarterback since Tim Tebow passed for 482 in the 2010 Sugar Bowl.

2020
In the Gators' first game of 2020 against Ole Miss, Trask eclipsed his own record, passing for 416 yards and 6 touchdowns, also setting an all-time team record for yards in a conference game in the process. Midway through the season, Trask threw for 474 yards and 4 touchdowns against then #4 Georgia, becoming the first quarterback in SEC history to throw 4 touchdowns in 5 consecutive games. As the season continued, Trask continued to put up record-setting numbers and became a betting favorite to win the Heisman. Trask finished the season setting the school's single-season passing touchdown record with 43, breaking the record set by Danny Wuerffel in 1996. Trask was named a Heisman Trophy Finalist following his historic season. Trask declared for the 2021 NFL Draft following the season.

Statistics

Professional career

Trask was selected by the Tampa Bay Buccaneers in the second round, 64th overall, of the 2021 NFL Draft. On June 8, 2021, Trask signed his four-year rookie contract with the Buccaneers, worth $5.54 million and a $1.39 million signing bonus.

NFL career statistics

Personal life
Trask was named after Kyle Field, Texas A&M University's football stadium, as his parents and several other family members attended there. His grandfather, Orville Trask, was a defensive tackle and team captain for the Houston Oilers team that won the 1960 and 1961 American Football League championships.

References

External links
 
 Florida Gators bio
 Tampa Bay Buccaneers bio

1998 births
Living people
People from Brazoria County, Texas
Sportspeople from the Houston metropolitan area
Players of American football from Texas
American football quarterbacks
Florida Gators football players
Tampa Bay Buccaneers players